Yago Paredes Rivera (born 1 November 2004) is a Spanish footballer who plays as a forward for AD Alcorcón B.

Club career
Born in Madrid, Paredes represented CD Nuevo Boadilla, EF Madrid Oeste Boadilla, Getafe CF (two stints), CD Móstoles URJC and AD Alcorcón as a youth. After impressing with the latter's Juvenil side, he made his senior debut with the reserves on 5 September 2021, starting in a 1–1 Tercera División RFEF home draw against Getafe CF B.

Paredes scored his first senior goal on 15 September 2021, netting the equalizer for the B's in a 1–1 home draw against AD Parla. He made his first team debut the following 6 March, coming on as a late substitute for Óscar Rivas in a 0–1 away loss against CD Lugo in the Segunda División championship.

References

External links
AD Alcorcón profile 

2004 births
Living people
Footballers from Madrid
Spanish footballers
Association football forwards
Segunda División players
Tercera Federación players
AD Alcorcón B players
AD Alcorcón footballers